OGDL (Ordered Graph Data Language), is a "structured textual format that represents information in the form of graphs, where the nodes are strings and the arcs or edges are spaces or indentation."

Like XML, but unlike JSON and YAML, OGDL includes a schema notation and path traversal notation.  There is also a binary representation.

Example 
network
  eth0
    ip   192.168.0.10
    mask 255.255.255.0

hostname crispin

See also
 Comparison of data serialization formats

References

External links 
 OGDL home page

Data serialization formats
Markup languages